This list of the Paleozoic life of West Virginia contains the various prehistoric life-forms whose fossilized remains have been reported from within the US state of West Virginia and are between 538.8 and 252.17 million years of age.

A

 †Acosmoblatta
 †Acosmoblatta eakiniana – type locality for species
 †Acosmoblatta permacra – type locality for species
 †Acrospirifer
 †Adiantities
 †Adiantities beechensis – type locality for species
 †Adiantites
 †Adiantites tenuifolius
 †Ageleodus
  †Alethopteris
 †Alethopteris ambigua – or unidentified comparable form
 †Alethopteris aquilina
 †Alethopteris decurrens
 †Alethopteris evansii
 †Alethopteris gigas
 †Alethopteris grandini
 †Alethopteris grandifolia – or unidentified comparable form
 †Alethopteris massilionis
 †Alethopteris lonchitica
 †Alethopteris parva
 †Alethopteris pennsylvanica
 †Alethopteris serlii
 †Alethopteris serlii var. americana
 †Alethopteris serlii var. europaea
 †Alethopteris sternberg
 †Alethopteris virginiana
 †Allenella
 †Allenella tullius
 †Amblyblatta
 †Amblyblatta lata – type locality for species
 †Ambocoelia
 †Ambocoelia gregaria
 †Ambocoelia umbonata
 †Amoeboblatta
 †Amoeboblatta permanenta – type locality for species
 †Aneimites
 †Aneimites adiantoides
 †Aneimites fertilis – previously classified as †Wardia fertilis
 †Aneimites tenuifolius – or unidentified related form
 †Aneurophyton – or unidentified related form
 †Aneurophyton olnense
  †Annularia
 †Annularia acicularis
 †Annularia asteris
 †Annularia carinata
 †Annularia cuspidata
 †Annularia galoides
 †Annularia minuta
 †Annularia mucronata
 †Annularia radiata
 †Annularia ramosa
 †Annularia sphenophylloides
 †Annularia stellata
 †Anoplea
 †Anoplea nucleata
 †Anthraconauta
 †Aparchites
 †Aparchites obliquatus
 †Aparchites punctillosa
 †Apempherus
 †Apempherus complexinervis – type locality for species
 †Apempherus fossus – type locality for species
 †Aphlebia
 †Aphlebia filiciformis
 †Aphlebia filiciformis var. majus
 †Aphlebia laciniata
 †Aphlebia lactuca
 †Aphlebia speciosissima
 †Aphlebia spinosa
 †Archaeopteridium
 †Archaeopteridium tschermackei
 †Archaeopteris
 †Archaeopteris halliana
 †Archaeopteris hibernica
  †Archaeopteris macilenta
 †Archaeopteris obusa
 †Archaeopteris sphenophyllifolia
 †Archaeopteris stricta – or unidentified related form
 †Areomartus – type locality for genus
 †Areomartus ovatus – type locality for species
 †Arrhythmoblatta
 †Arrhythmoblatta detecta – type locality for species
 †Arrhythmoblatta scudderiana – type locality for species
 †Artisia
 †Artisia approximata
 †Asolanus
 †Asolanus camptotaenia
 †Asterocalamites
 †Asterocalamites scrobiculatus
 †Asterophyllites
 †Asterophyllites charaeformis
 †Asterophyllites equisetiformis
 †Asterophyllites erectifolius
 †Asterophyllites gracilis
 †Asterophyllites longifolius
 †Asterophyllites lycopodioides
 †Asterophyllites minutus
 †Asterophyllites rigidus
 †Athyris
 †Athyris angelica
 †Atrypa
  †Atrypa reticularis – report made of unidentified related form or using admittedly obsolete nomenclature
 †Aulacotheca
 †Aulacotheca campbellii
  †Aulopora
  †Aviculopecten
 †Aviculopecten batesvillensis
 †Aviculopecten crenistriatus – or unidentified comparable form

B

 †Baiera
 †Baiera braun
 †Baiera virginiana
 †Barbclabornia
 †Barbclabornia luedersensis
 †Barinophyton
 †Barinophyton sibiricum
 †Bassipterus
 †Bassipterus virginicus
 †Beyrichia
 †Beyrichia moodeyi
 †Bluefieldius
 †Bluefieldius mercerensis
 †Bollia
 †Bollia hama
 †Bollia hindei
 †Bollia nitida
 †Bollia planofibra
 †Bollia ungula
 †Bothrodendron
 †Bothrodendron minutifolium – or unidentified comparable form
 †Bradyblatta
 †Bradyblatta mucronata – type locality for species
 †Bradyblatta sagittaria – type locality for species
 †Buthotrephis
 †Buthotrephis gracilis
 Bythocypris
 †Bythocypris keyserensis
 †Bythocypris phaseolina

C

  †Calamites
 †Calamites approximatus
 †Calamites cannaeformis
 †Calamites cistii
 †Calamites radiatus
 †Calamites ramosus
 †Calamites roemeri
 †Calamites suckowi
 †Calamites suckowii
 †Calamostachys
 †Calamostachys lanceolata
 †Calamostachys ramosus
  †Callipteridium
 †Callipteridium dawsonianum
 †Callipteridium grandifolium
 †Callipteridium inaequale
 †Callipteridium oblongifolium
 †Callipteridium odontopteroides
 †Callipteridium unitum
 †Callipteris
 †Callipteris conferta
 †Callipteris diabolica
  †Callixylon
 †Callixylon erianum
 †Calymene
 †Calymene camerata
 †Calymene cresapensis
  †Calymene niagarensis
 †Camarotoechia
 †Camarotoechia andrewsi
 †Camarotoechia limitare
 †Camarotoechia litchfieldensis
 †Camarotoechia tonolowayensis
 †Caneyella
 †Caneyella richardsoni
 †Cardiocarpon
 †Cardiocarpon bicuspidatum
 †Cardiocarpon cornutum
 †Cardiocarpon elongatum
 †Cardiocarpon minor
 †Cardiocarpus
 †Cardiomorpha
 †Cardiomorpha obovata
 †Cardiopteris
 †Cardiopteris frondosa
 †Carniodus
 †Carniodus carnulus
 †Carpolithes
 †Carpolithes bi-carpus
 †Carpolithes ellipticus
 †Carpolithes fragarioides – tentative report
 †Carpolithes marginatus
 †Carpolithes virginianus – type locality for species
 †Caulopteris
 †Caulopteris elliptica
 †Caulopteris gigantea
 †Cavellina
 †Cavellina planoprocliva
 †Charbeckia
 †Charbeckia macrophylla
 †Cheilanthites
 †Cheilanthites nummularius – or unidentified comparable form.
 †Cheilanthites obtusilobus
 †Cheilanthites obtusilobus var. dilatata
 †Cheilanthites solidus
 †Cheilanthites squamosus
 †Cheilanthites trifoliatus
 †Chonetes
 †Chonetes novascoticus
 †Clidochirus
 †Coelospira
 †Coelospira sulcata
 †Condrusia
 †Cordaicarpon
 †Cordaicarpon circularis
 †Cordaicarpon cinctum
 †Cordaicarpon gutbieri
  †Cordaites
 †Cordaites borassifolius
 †Cordaites crassinervis
 †Cordaites principalis
 †Cordaites robbii
 †Cornulites
 †Courvoisiella
 †Courvoisiella ctenomorpha
  †Crassigyrinus
 †Crossoceras
 †Crossoceras belandi
 †Crurispina
 †Crurispina nana
 †Cupularostrum
 †Cupularostrum contracta
 †Cyclopteris
 †Cyclopteris valida – probably the same as Triphyllopteris virginiana
 †Cyperites
 †Cyperites bicarinatus
 †Cypricardella

D

 †Dalmanella
 †Dalmanella lenticularis
  †Dalmanites
 †Dalmanites limulurus
 †Danaeides
 †Danaeides emersoni
 †Delthyris
 †Deltopecten
 †Deltopecten caneyanus – or unidentified comparable form
 †Devonochonetes
 †Devonochonetes coronatus
 †Devonochonetes scitulus
 †Dibolbina
 †Dibolbina cristata
 †Dichophyllum
 †Dichophyllum moorei
 †Dicladoblatta
 †Dicladoblatta defossa – type locality for species
 †Diedrorynchus – type locality for genus
 †Diedrorynchus dictyum – type locality for species
  †Diploceraspis
 †Diploceraspis burkei
 †Diplothema
 †Diplothema pachyderma
 †Distomodus
 †Distomodus nodosus – type locality for species
 †Ditomopyge
 †Ditomopyge decurtata
 †Dizygopleura
 †Dizygopleura costata
 †Dizygopleura halli
 †Dizygopleura orealis
 †Dizygopleura simulans
 †Dizygopleura subovalis
 †Dolerotheca
 †Dolerotheca pennsylvanica
 †Donaldina
 †Donaldina superclivis – type locality for species
 †Douvillina
 †Douvillina inequistriata
 †Drepanellina
 †Drepanellina clarki
  †Drepanopterus
 †Drepanopterus nodosus

E

 †Ectogrammysia
 †Ectogrammysia inaffecta – type locality for species
 †Ectogrammysia prolata – type locality for species
  †Edaphosaurus
 †Edaphosaurus colohistion – type locality for species
 †Edmondia
 †Edmondia equilateralis
 †Edmondia equilateralus
 †Edmondia suborbiculata
 †Elkinsia
 †Elkinsia polymorpha
 †Endelocrinus
 †Endelocrinus kieri
 †Equisetides
 †Equisetides rugosus
 †Equisetides schimper
 †Equisetides striatus
 †Equisetites
 †Equisetites elongatus
 †Equisetites occidentalis
 †Equisetites rugosus
 †Equisetites striatus
 †Eremopteris
 †Eremopteris artemisiaefolia
 †Eremopteris cheathami
 †Eremopteris decomposita – or unidentified comparable form
 †Eremopteris elegans – or unidentified comparable form
 †Eremopteris lincolniana – or unidentified comparable form
 †Eremopteris macilenta
 †Eremopteris microphylla
 †Eremopteris sauvieri – or unidentified comparable form
 †Etoblattina
 †Etoblattina aperta – type locality for species
 †Etoblattina exigua – type locality for species
  †Eucalyptocrinites
 †Eukloedenella
 †Eukloedenella umbiculata
  †Eurypterus
 †Eurytaenia – type locality for genus
 †Eurytaenia virginiana – type locality for species
 †Eviostachya – or unidentified comparable form

F

  †Favosites
 †Favosites helderbergiae
 †Floweria
 †Floweria chemungensis

G

 †Gerablattina
 †Gerablattina eversa – type locality for species
 †Gerablattina inculta – type locality for species
 †Gerablattina perita – type locality for species
 †Gillespia
 †Gillespia randolphensis
  †Greererpeton
 †Greererpeton burkemorani
 †Guilielmites
 †Guilielmites geinitz
 †Guilielmites orbicularis
 †Gypidula
 †Gypidula coeymanensis
  †Gyracanthus

H

 †Halliella
 †Halliella fissurella
 †Halliella subequata
 †Halonia
 †Hapalocrinus
 †Hierogramma
 †Hindella
 †Hindella congregata
 †Holcospermum
 †Holcospermum maizerentense
  †Holopea
 †Holopea flintstonensis
 †Homeospira
 †Homeospira evax
 †Hormotoma
 †Hormotoma rowei
  †Hughmilleria
 †Hughmilleria bellistriata
 †Hylopus
 †Hylopus hamesi
 †Hyphantozyga
 †Hyphantozyga fenestrata – type locality for species

J

 †Jaeckelocystis

K

 †Kloedenella
 †Kloedenella bisulcata
 †Kloedenia
 †Kloedenia clarkei
 †Kloedenia normalis

L

 †Leperditia
 †Leperditia alta
 †Leperditia elongata – or unidentified comparable form
 †Leperditia scalaris
 †Lepidocystis
 †Lepidocystis vesicularis
  †Lepidodendron
 †Lepidodendron aculeatum
 †Lepidodendron acuminatum
 †Lepidodendron brittsii – or unidentified comparable form
 †Lepidodendron clypeatum
 †Lepidodendron dichotomum – or unidentified comparable form
 †Lepidodendron lanceolatum
 †Lepidodendron magnum – or unidentified comparable form
 †Lepidodendron modulatum
 †Lepidodendron obovatum
 †Lepidodendron rushvillense
 †Lepidodendron selaginoides
 †Lepidodendron sternbergii
 †Lepidodendron veltheimianum
 †Lepidodendropsis
 †Lepidodendropsis scobiniformis
 †Lepidophloios
 †Lepidophloios laricinus – or unidentified comparable form
 †Lepidophyllum
 †Lepidophyllum acuminatum
 †Lepidophyllum brevifolium
 †Lepidophyllum campbellianum
 †Lepidophyllum cultriforme – or unidentified comparable form
 †Lepidophyllum hastatum
 †Lepidophyllum jenneyi
 †Lepidophyllum lanceolatum
 †Lepidophyllum oblongifolium
 †Lepidostrobophyllum
 †Lepidostrobus
 †Lepidostrobus ornatus
 †Lepidostrobus salisburyi
 †Lepidostrobus variabilis
 †Lepocrinites
 †Lepocrinites gebhardi
 †Leptaena
 †Leptaena rhomboidalis – report made of unidentified related form or using admittedly obsolete nomenclature
 †Leptodesma
 †Leptodesma matheri
 †Leptodesma occidentale – or unidentified related form
 †Leptodesma pennsylvanica
 †Leptodesma spinerigum
 †Leptostrophia
 †Leptostrophia bipartita
 †Leptostrophia proutyi
 †Lescuropteris
 †Lescuropteris adiantites
 †Lescuropteris moorii
 †Levizygopleura
 †Levizygopleura inornata
 †Limipecten
 †Limipecten greerensis – type locality for species
 †Limnopus
 †Limnopus glenshawensis
 †Limnosceloides – type locality for genus
 †Limnosceloides dunkardensis – type locality for species
  †Lingula
 †Linopteris
 †Linopteris neuropteroides
 †Linopteris obliqua
 †Liocalymene
 †Liocalymene clintoni
 †Liparoblatta
 †Liparoblatta ovata – type locality for species
 †Liparoblatta radiata – type locality for species
 †Lithostrotion
 †Lithostrotion angustum
 †Lycopodites
 †Lycopodites meekii
 †Lycopodites pendulus
 †Lycopodites simplex
  †Lyginopteris
 †Lyginopteris bermudensiformis
 †Lyginopteris fragilis
 †Lyginopteris hoeninghausi
 †Lyginopteris hoeninghausii

M

 †Macrostachya
 †Mariacrinus – report made of unidentified related form or using admittedly obsolete nomenclature
 †Mariacrinus stoloniferus
 †Mariopteris
 †Mariopteris andraena
 †Mariopteris acuta
 †Mariopteris dimorpha – or unidentified comparable form
 †Mariopteris inflata
 †Mariopteris latifolia
 †Mariopteris muricata
 †Mariopteris nervosa
 †Mariopteris newberryi
 †Mariopteris pottsvillea
 †Mariopteris pygmaea
 †Mariopteris sillimanni
 †Mariopteris sphenopteroides
 †Mariopteris spinulosa – tentative report
 †Mediospirifer
 †Mediospirifer audaculus
 †Megakozlowskiella
 †Megakozlowskiella sculptilis
 †Megalichthyes – or unidentified comparable form
 †Megalopteris
 †Megalopteris dawsoni – or unidentified comparable form
 †Megalopteris hartii
 †Megalopteris sewellensis
 †Metapoblatta – type locality for genus
 †Metapoblatta microptera – type locality for species
 †Microsphaeridiorhynchus
 †Microsphaeridiorhynchus litchfieldensis
 †Modiolopsis
 †Modiolopsis gregarius
  †Modiolus
 †Modiolus waverliensis – or unidentified comparable form
    †Mucrospirifer
 †Mucrospirifer mucronatus
 †Murchisonia
 †Murchisonia minuta
 †Myelodactylus
 †Myelodactylus keyserensis
 †Mylacris – type locality for genus
 †Mylacris virginiana – type locality for species

N

 †Naiadites
 †Naticonema
 †Nematophyllum
 †Nematophyllum angustum
 †Nervostrophia
 †Nervostrophia nervosa
 †Neuralethopteris
 †Neuralethopteris pocahontas
 †Neuralethopteris smithsii
   †Neuropteris
 †Neuropteris agassizi
 †Neuropteris auriculata
 †Neuropteris biformis
 †Neuropteris callosa
 †Neuropteris carrii – or unidentified comparable form
 †Neuropteris cistii
 †Neuropteris cordata
 †Neuropteris crenulata
 †Neuropteris dictyopteroides
 †Neuropteris elrodi
 †Neuropteris fimbriata
 †Neuropteris flexuosa
 †Neuropteris gigantea
 †Neuropteris grangeri
 †Neuropteris heterophylla
 †Neuropteris lindleyana
 †Neuropteris loschii
 †Neuropteris odontopteroides
 †Neuropteris ovata
 †Neuropteris planchardi
 †Neuropteris planchardi var. longifolia
 †Neuropteris plicata
 †Neuropteris pocahontas
 †Neuropteris rarinervis
 †Neuropteris scheuchzeri
 †Neuropteris schlehani
 †Neuropteris smithii
 †Neuropteris sternberg
 †Neuropteris tenuifolia
 †Neuropteris vermicularis
 †Neuropteris zeilleri – or unidentified comparable form
 †Nuculavus
 †Nuculavus okawensis
 †Nuculopsis
 †Nuculopsis rectangula

O

 †Octonaria
 †Octonaria muricata
 †Odontopteris
 †Odontopteris aequalis
 †Odontopteris densifolia
 †Odontopteris gracillima
 †Odontopteris neuropteroides
 †Odontopteris nervosa
 †Odontopteris newberryi
 †Odontopteris obtusiloba
 †Odontopteris obtusiloba var. rarinervis
 †Odontopteris subcuneata
 †Odontopteris wortheni
 †Oligocarpia
 †Oligocarpia alabamensis
  †Onychodus
  †Orthacanthus – or unidentified comparable form
 †Orthoceras – report made of unidentified related form or using admittedly obsolete nomenclature
 †Orthogonophora – type locality for genus
 †Orthogonophora distincta – type locality for species
 †Orthomylacris
 †Orthomylacris franklini – type locality for species
 †Orthonychia
 †Orthonychia tortuosa
 †Oxynoblatta
 †Oxynoblatta alutacea – type locality for species

P

 †Palaeodictyopteron – report made of unidentified related form or using admittedly obsolete nomenclature
 †Palaeodictyopteron virginianum – type locality for species
 †Palaeolima
 †Palaeoneilo
 †Palaeoneilo sera
 †Palaeostylus
 †Palaeostylus venustus
 †Palaeoxyris
 †Palaeoxyris appendiculata
 †Paleyoldia
 †Paleyoldia levistriata
 †Paracyclas
 †Paracyclas lirata
 †Paraechmina
 †Paraechmina dubia
  †Parahughmilleria
 †Parahughmilleria bellistriata
 †Parallelodon
 †Parallelodon mimina
 †Parallelodon minima – or unidentified comparable form
 †Pareinoblatta
 †Pareinoblatta expuncta – type locality for species
  †Pecopteris
 †Pecopteris angustipinna
 †Pecopteris arborescens
 †Pecopteris arborescens var. integripinna
 †Pecopteris arguta
 †Pecopteris aspera
 †Pecopteris asplenioides
 †Pecopteris candolleana
 †Pecopteris dawsoniana
 †Pecopteris dentata
 †Pecopteris dentata var. crenata
 †Pecopteris dentata var. parva
 †Pecopteris elegans
 †Pecopteris elliptica
 †Pecopteris emarginata
 †Pecopteris feminaeformis
 †Pecopteris germari
 †Pecopteris germari var. crassinervis
 †Pecopteris germari var. cuspidata
 †Pecopteris goniopteroides
 †Pecopteris grandifolia
 †Pecopteris hemitelioides
 †Pecopteris hemiteloides
 †Pecopteris heeriana
 †Pecopteris imbricata
 †Pecopteris inclinata
 †Pecopteris integra – or unidentified comparable form
 †Pecopteris jenneyi – or unidentified comparable form
 †Pecopteris lanceolata
 †Pecopteris latifolia
 †Pecopteris longifolia
 †Pecopteris merianiopteroides
 †Pecopteris microphylla
 †Pecopteris miltoni
 †Pecopteris newberryana
 †Pecopteris nodosa
 †Pecopteris notata
 †Pecopteris oblonga
 †Pecopteris oblongifolia
 †Pecopteris odontopteroides
 †Pecopteris oreopteridia
 †Pecopteris ovoides
 †Pecopteris pachypteroides
 †Pecopteris pennaeformis
 †Pecopteris pennaeformis var. latifolia
 †Pecopteris platynervis
 †Pecopteris pluckeneti
 †Pecopteris pluckeneti var. constricta
 †Pecopteris plumosa
 †Pecopteris polymorpha
 †Pecopteris pteroides
 †Pecopteris rarinervis
 †Pecopteris rotundifolia
 †Pecopteris rotundiloba
 †Pecopteris schimperiana
 †Pecopteris serrulata – tentative report
 †Pecopteris sub-falcata
 †Pecopteris tenuinervis
 †Pecopteris unita
 †Pecopteris vestita
 †Pecopteris villosa
 †Penetoblatta
 †Penetoblatta rotundata – type locality for species
 †Penetoblatta virginiensis – type locality for species
  †Periechocrinus
 †Permophorus
 †Permophorus octocostatus
  †Petalodus
 †Petrablattina
 †Petrablattina ovata – type locality for species
   †Phacops
 †Phacops cristata
 †Phestia
 †Phestia pandoraeformis
 †Phestia rugodorsata
 †Phyloblatta
 †Phyloblatta abbreviata – type locality for species
 †Phyloblatta abdicata – type locality for species
 †Phyloblatta accubita – type locality for species
 †Phyloblatta angusta – type locality for species
 †Phyloblatta arcuata – type locality for species
 †Phyloblatta cassvilleana – type locality for species
 †Phyloblatta communis – type locality for species
 †Phyloblatta concinna – type locality for species
 †Phyloblatta debilis – type locality for species
 †Phyloblatta deducta – type locality for species
 †Phyloblatta dichotoma – type locality for species
 †Phyloblatta dimidiata – type locality for species
 †Phyloblatta elatior – type locality for species
 †Phyloblatta expugnata – type locality for species
 †Phyloblatta expulsata – type locality for species
 †Phyloblatta exsecuta – type locality for species
 †Phyloblatta fracta – type locality for species
 †Phyloblatta funeraria – type locality for species
 †Phyloblatta gratiosa – type locality for species
 †Phyloblatta immolata – type locality for species
 †Phyloblatta imperfecta – type locality for species
 †Phyloblatta lata – type locality for species
 †Phyloblatta macerata – type locality for species
 †Phyloblatta macilenta – type locality for species
 †Phyloblatta macroptera – type locality for species
 †Phyloblatta mactata – type locality for species
 †Phyloblatta mortua – type locality for species
 †Phyloblatta obatra – type locality for species
 †Phyloblatta praedulcis – type locality for species
 †Phyloblatta rebaptizata – type locality for species
 †Phyloblatta regularis – type locality for species
 †Phyloblatta residua – type locality for species
 †Phyloblatta rogi – type locality for species
 †Phyloblatta scudderiana – type locality for species
 †Phyloblatta secreta – type locality for species
 †Phyloblatta uniformis – type locality for species
 †Phyloblatta virginiana – type locality for species
 †Phyloblatta vulgata – type locality for species
 †Physonemus
  †Pinna
 †Pinna missouriensis
   †Platyceras
 †Platyceras gebharti
 †Platyceras magnificum
 †Plocezyga
 †Plocezyga acuminata
 †Plocezyga obscura – type locality for species
 †Plocezyga subquadrata – type locality for species
 †Plocezyga turbinata
 †Poacordaites
 †Polidevcia
 †Polidevcia stevensiana
 †Polyetoblatta – type locality for genus
 †Polyetoblatta calopteryx – type locality for species
 †Ponderodictya
 †Ponderodictya favulosa
 †Poroblattina
 †Poroblattina gratiosa – type locality for species
 †Poroblattina parvula – type locality for species
 †Productella
 †Productella rectispina
 †Promytilus
 †Promytilus illinoisensis
 †Protathyris
 †Protathyris congregata
 †Protaxocrinus
  †Proterogyrinus
 †Proterogyrinus scheelei
 †Prothyris
 †Prothyris acuticarinata – type locality for species
 †Protoleptostrophia
 †Protoleptostrophia perplana
  †Protorothyris – type locality for genus
 †Protorothyris morani – type locality for species
 †Pseudocrinites
 †Pseudozygopleura
 †Pseudozygopleura multicostata – or unidentified comparable form
 †Pseudozygopleura pandus
 †Pseudozygopleura schucherti – or unidentified comparable form
 †Pseudozygopleura scitula
 †Pseudozygopleura tenuivirga
 †Pterinea
 †Pterinea emacerata – or unidentified comparable form
 †Pterinea flintstonensis
 †Ptychopteria
 †Ptychopteria pusilla – type locality for species
 †Pustulatia
 †Pustulatia pustulosa
 †Pycnosaccus

R

 †Rafinesquina
 †Resserella
 †Resserella elegantula
 †Rhabdocarpos
 †Rhabdocarpos amygdalaeformis
 †Rhabdocarpos bockschianus
 †Rhabdocarpos multistriatus
 †Rhabdocarpos oblongatus
 †Rhabdocarpos sulcatus
 †Rhabdocarpos tenax
 †Rhacophyton
 †Rhacophyton ceratangium
 †Rhipidomella
 †Rhipidomella hybrida
 †Rhipidomella leucosia – or unidentified comparable form
 †Rhipidomella penelope – or unidentified comparable form
 †Rhipidomella vanuxemi
  †Rhodea
 †Rhodea vepertina – type locality for species
 †Rhynchospirina
 †Rhynchospirina globosa
 †Rodea (genus)
 †Rodea vespertina – type locality for species

S

 †Sagenodus – or unidentified comparable form
 †Sanguinolites
 †Sanguinolites naiadiformis – or unidentified comparable form
 †Sanguinolites obliquus – or unidentified comparable form
 †Sanguinolites unioniformis – or unidentified comparable form
 †Saportaea
 †Saportaea grandifolia
 †Saportaea salisburioides
 †Schellwienella
 †Schellwienella elegans
 †Schellwienella interstriata
 †Schellwienella rugosa
 †Schizodus
 †Schizodus chesterensis – or unidentified related form
 †Schizodus depressus
 †Schizophoria
 †Schizophoria impressa
 †Schuchertella
 †Schuchertella deckerensis
 †Schuchertella variabilis
 †Scudderula
 †Scudderula arcta – type locality for species
 †Scyphocrinites
 †Sedgwickia – tentative report
 †Septimyalina
 †Shenophyllum
 †Shenophyllum cunefolium
 †Shenophyllum tenerrimum
 †Shenopteris
 †Shenopteris elegans
 †Shenopteris launoitii
   †Sigillaria
 †Sigillaria approximata
 †Sigillaria brardii
 †Sigillaria camptotaenia
 †Sigillaria dentata – or unidentified comparable form
 †Sigillaria fissa
 †Sigillaria ichthyolepis – or unidentified comparable form
 †Sigillaria reticulata – or unidentified comparable form
 †Sigillaria menardi
 †Solenomorpha
 †Solenomorpha nitida
 †Sphaerocystites
 †Sphaerotocrinus
  †Sphenophyllum
 †Sphenophyllum angustifolium
 †Sphenophyllum antiquum
 †Sphenophyllum cornutum
 †Sphenophyllum cuneifolium
 †Sphenophyllum densifolium
 †Sphenophyllum emarginatum
 †Sphenophyllum filiculme
 †Sphenophyllum fontaineaum
 †Sphenophyllum furcatum
 †Sphenophyllum lescurianum
 †Sphenophyllum longifolium
 †Sphenophyllum majus
 †Sphenophyllum oblongifolia
 †Sphenophyllum oblongifolium
 †Sphenophyllum subtenerrimmum
 †Sphenophyllum tenue
 †Sphenophyllum tenuifolium
 †Sphenopteridium
 †Sphenopteridium bifidum
 †Sphenopteridium brooksi – type locality for species
 †Sphenopteridium girtiyi – type locality for species
 †Sphenopteridium virginianum
  †Sphenopteris
 †Sphenopteris acrocarpa
 †Sphenopteris auriculata
 †Sphenopteris breviloba
 †Sphenopteris broadheadi – or unidentified comparable form
 †Sphenopteris canneltonensis – or unidentified comparable form
 †Sphenopteris chaerophylloides
 †Sphenopteris communis
 †Sphenopteris deliculata
 †Sphenopteris dentata
 †Sphenopteris dicksonioides
 †Sphenopteris distans
 †Sphenopteris divaricata
 †Sphenopteris dubuissonis – or unidentified comparable form
 †Sphenopteris elegans
 †Sphenopteris flexicaulis
 †Sphenopteris foliosa
 †Sphenopteris formosa
 †Sphenopteris furcata
 †Sphenopteris goepperti – or unidentified comparable form
 †Sphenopteris hastata
 †Sphenopteris hymenophylloides
 †Sphenopteris hoeninghausii
 †Sphenopteris karwinensis
 †Sphenopteris larischii – or unidentified comparable form
 †Sphenopteris lescuriana
 †Sphenopteris linearis – or unidentified comparable form
 †Sphenopteris linkii
 †Sphenopteris lobata
 †Sphenopteris microcarpa
 †Sphenopteris minuti-secta
 †Sphenopteris mixta
 †Sphenopteris obtusiloba
 †Sphenopteris ophioglossoides
 †Sphenopteris pachynervis
 †Sphenopteris patentissima
 †Sphenopteris pinnatifida
 †Sphenopteris rarinervis
 †Sphenopteris royi – or unidentified comparable form
 †Sphenopteris schatzlarensis
 †Sphenopteris spinosa
 †Sphenopteris stipulata – or unidentified comparable form
 †Sphenopteris subgeniculata
 †Sphenopteris tenella
 †Sphenopteris tracyana
 †Sphenopteris trichomanoides – or unidentified comparable form
 †Sphenotus
 †Sphenotus aeolus – tentative report
 †Sphenotus monroensis
 †Sphenotus pisinnus – tentative report
 †Sphenotus washingtonensis – or unidentified comparable form
 †Spinatrypa
 †Spinatrypa hystrix
 †Spinocyrtia
 †Spinocyrtia granulosa
  †Spirifer – report made of unidentified related form or using admittedly obsolete nomenclature
 †Spirifer corallinensis
 †Spirifer keyserensis
 †Spirifer mackenzicus
 †Spirifer vanuxemi
 †Stegerhynchus
 †Stegerhynchus neglectum
 †Stenochisma
 †Stenochisma lamellata
    †Stigmaria
 †Stigmaria ficoides
 †Stigmaria stellata
 †Streblochondria
 †Streblochondria girtyi
 †Streblochondria mutata – type locality for species
 †Streblochondria tiltoni – type locality for species
 †Streblopteria
 †Streblopteria girtyi – type locality for species
 †Stromatopora
 †Stromatopora constellata
 †Symphyoblatta
 †Symphyoblatta debilis – type locality for species
 †Synchirocrinus
 †Synchirocrinus keyserensis
 †Sysciophlebia
 †Sysciophlebia balteata – type locality for species
 †Sysciophlebia invisa – type locality for species
 †Sysciophlebia patiens – type locality for species
 †Sysciophlebia recidiva – type locality for species

T

 †Taeniopteris
 †Taeniopteris lescuriana
 †Taeniopteris newberriana
 †Taeniopteris newberriana var. angusta
 †Tanypterichthys – type locality for genus
 †Tanypterichthys pridensis – type locality for species
   †Tentaculites
 †Tentaculites gyracanthus
 †Tentaculites minutus
 †Tetracystis
 †Tetrameroceras
 †Tetrameroceras cumberlandicum
 †Thlipsura
 †Thlipsura ultimata
 †Thlipsurella
 †Thlipsurella semipunctata
 †Tradonis
 †Tradonis castrensis
 †Trigonocarpum
 †Trigonocarpum ampullaeforme
 †Trigonocarpum clavatum
 †Trigonocarpum noeggerathii
 †Trigonocarpum oliviaeforme
 †Trigonocarpum trioculare
 †Trigonocarpus
 †Triletes
 †Trimerus
 †Trimerus delphinocephalus
 †Triphyllopteris
 †Triphyllopteris latilobata – type locality for species
 †Triphyllopteris rarinervis – type locality for species
 †Tropidoleptus
 †Tropidoleptus carinatus
 †Truncatiramus – now regarded as a jr. synonym of Erettopterus
 †Truncatiramus exopthalmus
 †Tylothyris
 †Tylothyris mesacostalis

U

 †Ulodendron
 †Ulodendron majus
 †Uncinulus
 †Uncinulus convexorus
 †Uncinulus marylandicus
 †Uncinulus obtusiplicatus
 †Unicinulus
 †Unicinulus marylandicus
 †Unklesbayella
 †Unklesbayella geinitzi

W

  †Waeringopterus
 †Waeringopterus cumberlandicus
 †Wardia
 †Wardia fertilis – Later reclassified as †Aneimites fertilis
 †Welleria
 †Welleria obliqua
 †Whitfieldella
 †Whitfieldella marylandica
 †Whittleseya
 †Whittleseya elegans
 †Wilkingia
 †Wilkingia andrewsi
 †Wilkingia neglecta – or unidentified related form
 †Wilkingia walkeri
 †Wurmiella
 †Wurmiella excavata

X

 †Xenotheca

Z

  †Zatrachys
 †Zatrachys serratus
 †Zygobeyrichia
 †Zygobeyrichia incipiens
 †Zygobeyrichia tonolowayensis
 †Zygobeyrichia ventricornis
 †Zygobeyrichia ventripunctata
 †Zygobeyrichia virginia
 †Zygosella
 †Zygosella vallata

References

Uncited inclusions
Uncited inclusions can be attributed to:
 

Paleozoic
Life
West Virginia